Hasenauer is a German language habitational surname for someone from Hasenau in Silesia (abandoned locality in Dolnośląskie). Notable people with the name include:
 Bartholomäus Hasenauer (1892–1980), Austrian politician
 Bertram Hasenauer (1970), Austrian painter
 Carolin Hasenauer, German journalist
 Georg Hasenauer (1811–1888), Austrian priest
 Gerald Hasenauer (1970), Austrian visual artist
 Hermann Hasenauer (1886–?), German writer
 Hubert Hasenauer (1962), German forestry scientist
 Johann Georg Hasenauer (1887–1929), Austrian priest
 Jan Hasenauer (1983), German systems biologist
 Karl von Hasenauer (1833–1894), Austrian architect 
 Richard Erwin Hasenauer, American mathematician
 Stefan Hasenauer, Austrian researcher
 Ute Hasenauer (1966), German violinist

References 

German-language surnames
German toponymic surnames